Oye! is a 2009 Indian Telugu-language romantic drama film written and directed by debutanat Anand Ranga. The film stars Siddharth and Shamili (in her first leading role), while Sunil and Ali play supporting roles. The music of the film was composed by Yuvan Shankar Raja. The story revolves around Uday (Siddharth) fulfilling the wishes of Sandhya (Shamili) during her last days, as the latter was diagnosed with cancer.

The film was released on 3 July 2009. The film is loosely based on the 2002 film A Walk to Remember. The film was dubbed in Tamil as Kadhal Alai.

Plot
Uday, is a rich kid who becomes the chairman of a company following his father's death He believes in the adage of life is short and carpe diem. At a New Year's Party 2007, he spies on a girl called Sandhya in a salwar-kameez, writing a diary at the pub.

Through a series of searches with his friend Fatso, he ends up discovering that Sandhya lives alone at a beachside house and runs a nursery. She is very traditional with her own ideals.  He enters in her house on a pretence as a paying guest to make her fall in love with him. After a series of attempts to woo Sandhya, Uday eventually succeeds and presents her with 12 gifts on her birthday, the last being Uday himself.

In a subplot, an insurance salesman named Abhishek ends up trying to show his younger and reclusive colleague "how to be a man" in many lessons that often result in the latter's physical pain. Eventually, the duo collides with the story's main plot when they attempt to sell Sandhya life insurance (which she later agrees to buy). When asked who the beneficiary of the policy should be, she writes Uday's name. When Uday hears this, he thinks that he has won Sandhya.  However, it is revealed to Uday (through the insurance policy which has now been rejected) that Sandhya is suffering from breast cancer (lobular carcinoma) and has limited time left.

In the ensuing part of the film, Uday takes Sandhya on a cruise to Calcutta to spread her parents' ashes in the Ganges River. They run into several comic characters in their journey, including a kidnapped Abishek who tries unsuccessfully to tell Sandhya that her policy was rejected because of her illness; his attempts are thwarted by Uday. These circumstances help Uday teach Sandya how to live life, and back from the trip, Sandhya and Uday throw a Christmas party at Sandhya's beach house. However, Sandhya collapses in the aftermath of the party and discovers the truth about her health.

Sandhya eventually falls in love with Uday and says that she wants to spend the last days of her life with him. The ending scene has Uday and Sandhya sitting on a bench in the rain with a "Welcome 2008" sign in the background on New Year's Eve. The scene then fades to Uday sitting alone with a "Welcome 2009" sign in the background one year later waiting for the rain. This infers that Sandhya has died, but Uday still keeps her memories close to heart. The film ends with Uday leaving after the rain.

Cast 

 Siddharth as Uday
 Shamili as Sandhya
 Sunil as Abhishek
 Ali as Layout Lingaraju, Real Estate Agent 1
 Napoleon as Dr. Harish Chandra Prasad
 Pradeep Rawat as Ras Bihari
 Krishnudu as Fatso
 M. S. Narayana as Hotel Manager
 Tanikella Bharani as Telugu Teacher
 Saptagiri as Abhishek's assistant
 Master Bharath as Real Estate Agent 2
 Surekha Vani as Satya
 Raavi Kondala Rao as Koteswara Rao "Kotigadu"
 Radha Kumari as Koteswara Rao's wife
 Bhanu as Loan Recovery Goon
 Baby Srilekha as Sri

Soundtrack 

The music, including film score and soundtrack was composed by Tamil film composer Yuvan Shankar Raja. The soundtrack, released on 22 May 2009 at Rama Naidu studios, features 6 tracks overall, out of which, Yuvan Shankar Raja himself has sung one song and one song by the film's lead actor Siddharth.The lyrics were penned by five people, with Vanamali writing the lyrics for three of the six songs, Chandrabose, Anantha Sreeram for each one song and Surendra Krishna and Krishna Chaitanya together for the last song. The theme is inspired from the Tom Hanks comedy, Forrest Gump.

Yuvan Shankar Raja received positive reviews for his musical score, which was described as a "rhythmic joy", "superb", "a blast" and "a highlight of the movie".. The songs also gained attraction, especially among the youth, topping the charts for several weeks.

Track listing

Reception 
A critic from Rediff.com wrote that "All in all, a good film".

Awards

Filmfare Awards South
Filmfare Special Award - South for Outstanding Score – Yuvan Shankar Raja 
CineMAA Award for Best Female Debut - Shamili

References

External links 
 

2009 films
2000s Telugu-language films
2009 romantic drama films
Films shot in Visakhapatnam
Indian romantic drama films